Brajan is a Serbian male given name.  It may refer to:

Brajan Nenezić (born 1953), Yugoslav footballer
Petar (fl. 1332), nicknamed Brajan, a Serbian count that built the White Church in Karan, Užice

See also
Brian, British name, transcribed in Serbian as "Brajan"; variants Bryan, Brayan.
Brajko, Serbian name

Serbian masculine given names